The Luck of the Navy  is a 1927 British silent comedy thriller film directed by Fred Paul and starring Evelyn Laye, Henry Victor and Hayford Hobbs. It was an adaptation of the 1919 play The Luck of the Navy by Mrs Clifford Mills. It was shot at Cricklewood Studios.

Cast
 Evelyn Laye as Cynthia Eden
 Henry Victor as Lieutenant Clive Stanton
 Hayford Hobbs as Louis Peel
 Robert Cunningham as Admiral Maybridge
 Norma Whalley as Mrs Peel
 H. Agar Lyons as  Colonel Dupont
 William Freshman as Wing Eden
 Basil Griffen as Anna
 Zoe Palmer as Dora Green
 H. Saxon-Snell as Francois 
 Douglas Herald as Joe Briggs
 Wally Patch as Stoker Clark
 Burton Craig as Lord Nelson
 Joan Langford Reed as  Dora - Child

References

Bibliography
 Low, Rachael. History of the British Film, 1918-1929. George Allen & Unwin, 1971.
 Wood, Linda. British Films, 1927-1939. British Film Institute, 1986.

External links

1927 films
1920s comedy thriller films
British films based on plays
Films directed by Fred Paul
British silent feature films
British comedy thriller films
Films shot at Cricklewood Studios
Seafaring films
British black-and-white films
1927 comedy films
1920s English-language films
1920s British films
Silent comedy films
Silent adventure films
Silent thriller films